Alice Cancel is the former Assembly member for the 65th District of the New York State Assembly. She is a Democrat. The district included the neighborhoods of the Lower East Side, East Village, Little Italy, Chinatown, SoHo, TriBeCa, the Financial District, Battery Park and Governor's Island in Manhattan. In 2016, Cancel was defeated in the Democratic primary for her seat by Yuh-Line Niou.

Life and career
Born in Puerto Rico, Cancel was raised in the South Bronx and on the Lower East Side of Manhattan. She has long been active in Democratic politics, serving as a District Leader in her community for over twenty-five years. Prior to election to the Assembly, Cancel worked in the New York Senate as well as for New York City Comptroller Scott Stringer.

Cancel is married to John Quinn, who is a longtime labor leader in New York City.

New York Assembly
Former Speaker Sheldon Silver was found guilty of corruption in 2015 and was forced to relinquish the seat he held in the New York Assembly for nearly forty years, opening up the seat for a special election. As a result, the Manhattan Democratic party and local district leaders were provided with the opportunity to select the Democratic candidate to run in the April 19, 2016, special election.

Numerous candidates stepped up to seek the nomination for the safely Democratic 65th Assembly District, including Cancel, in what proved to be a very contentious process. Amid controversy, the leaders ultimately chose Cancel, who some had accused of being hand-picked by Silver and his supporters to replace him despite being underfunded compared to her competitors.

In the election, Cancel faced Republican Lester Chang, Green Party candidate Dennis Levy and Working Families Party candidate Yuh-Line Niou, who had outraised Cancel overwhelmingly and was seen as a candidate who could make the race close. Cancel was out-spent 100 to one and her opponents received more political endorsements than Cancel did. In a closely watched race, Cancel ultimately won the election with 41% of the vote, besting Niou by 1,034 votes, with Chang and Levy together taking 23%.

Cancel was sworn into office on May 10, 2016. She ran again in the 2016 primary election to retain her seat for a full, two-year term but was defeated by Niou. Cancel remained a candidate in the general election on the Women's Equality Party Line, but lost again to Niou in the November 8 general election.

References

External links

American politicians of Puerto Rican descent
Living people
Hispanic and Latino American state legislators in New York (state)
Hispanic and Latino American women in politics
Democratic Party members of the New York State Assembly
People from the Lower East Side
People from Mayagüez, Puerto Rico
21st-century American politicians
Women state legislators in New York (state)
Politicians from the Bronx
21st-century American women politicians
1955 births